Blue Heaven is a Scottish television documentary series filmed by BBC Scotland which followed aspiring young footballers at Rangers Football Club as they tried to forge a career in football. The series was originally broadcast in the winter of 2003 with a follow up episode in 2011.

Background
The building of Rangers' new training facility in July 2001 was the catalyst for the filming of a six-part television series by BBC Scotland. The show documented the hopes and aspirations of a group of young footballers as they try to make the breakthrough at Rangers.

The production company, Saltire Films, was given unprecedented access for two years, the series begins during the Dick Advocaat era and continues through to the Alex McLeish's reign. The length of filming allowed for the following of particular youngsters.

Some of those would go on to graduate to the first team, Chris Burke for example. His Rangers debut covered during the series. Other players never made it as a professional footballer at all. Rangers-daft David Ford and his family's story is covered as Ford struggles to make an impact due to his lack of height and slight frame. The Head of Youth Development, Jan Derks, is replaced part-way through filming the series and is replaced by George Adams. Derks was seen deciding on the futures of young players, including Kevin Morrison, who was eventually released by the club.

In May 2011, a follow up episode was broadcast featuring several of the trainees from the original documentary.

Episodes

List of footballers which appeared

Players who graduated to first team
 Charlie Adam
 Steven Smith
 Chris Burke
 Jordan McMillan

Players who made careers with other clubs
 Steven Campbell
 Calum Reidford
 Peter Leven
 Scott Agnew

References

External links
 
 Locate TV

Rangers F.C.
BBC television documentaries
2003 Scottish television series debuts
2003 Scottish television series endings
2000s Scottish television series
BBC Scotland television shows
Association football documentary television series